The 2017 France Sevens was the fourth tournament within the 2016–17 World Rugby Women's Sevens Series. It was held over the weekend of 24–25 June 2017 at Stade Gabriel Montpied in Clermont-Ferrand.

Format
The teams are drawn into three pools of four teams each. Each team plays every other team in their pool once. The top two teams from each pool advance to the Cup/Plate brackets while the top 2 third place teams also compete in the Cup/Plate. The other teams from each group play-off for the Challenge Trophy.

Teams

Pool stage

Pool A

Pool B

Pool C

Knockout stage

Challenge Trophy

5th Place

Cup

Tournament placings

See also
 World Rugby Women's Sevens Series
 2016–17 World Rugby Women's Sevens Series
 World Rugby

References

External links
Official website

2017
2016–17 World Rugby Women's Sevens Series
2017 in French women's sport
June 2017 sports events in France
2017 in women's rugby union
2016–17 in French rugby union